A referendum on the reform of the Andalusian Statute of Autonomy was held in Andalusia on Sunday, 18 February 2007. Voters were asked whether they ratified a statutory amendment which effectively approved a new Statute of Autonomy of Andalusia. The draft Statute had been submitted to the consideration of the Spanish Cortes Generales at the end of the previous year, where it had been approved in both the Congress of Deputies on 2 November 2006 (with a 306–0 result) and in the Spanish Senate on 20 December (with a 242–0 result).

The question asked was "Do you approve of the Statute of Autonomy of Andalusia Bill?". The referendum resulted in 90.2% of valid votes in support of the bill on a turnout of just 35.9%, and resulted in the approval of a new Statute of Autonomy replacing the 1981 Statute, which received royal assent on 19 March and was published in the Official State Gazette on 20 March 2007.

Results

Overall

Results by province

See also
2006 Catalan Statute of Autonomy referendum

References

2007 in Andalusia
2007 referendums
Referendums in Andalusia
February 2007 events in Europe
Andalusia